Broomsthorpe is a place and former civil parish, now in the parish of East Rudham, in the King's Lynn and West Norfolk district, in the English county of Norfolk. It is the site of a deserted medieval village with scheduled ancient monument status to the south of Coxford. This may be the location of the village of Sengham or possibly Tattersett St Andrew. It lies south-east of the site of Coxford Priory in the parish of Tattersett. In 1931 the parish had a population of 22. Broomsthorpe was an extra-parochial area, in 1858 it became a separate civil parish, on 1 April 1935 the parish was abolished and merged with East Rudham.

The villages name means 'Brun's outlying farm/settlement'.

The modern place of Broomsthorpe is in the parish of East Rudham to the south-west of the deserted village site. It consists of a handful of houses and the Grade II listed Broomsthorpe Hall dating from around 1800.

References

External links

Villages in Norfolk
Former civil parishes in Norfolk
King's Lynn and West Norfolk